The 2018 Sukma Games, officially known as the 19th Sukma Games was a multi-sport event held in Perak from 11 to 22 September 2018. This was Perak's second time to host the Sukma Games and its first time since 1994.

The games was held from 11 to 22 September 2018, although several events had commenced from 8 September 2018. Around 7464 athletes from 13 states, Federal Territory and Brunei participated at the games which featured 427 events in 29 sports. The games was opened by Nazrin Shah, the Sultan of Perak at the Perak Stadium.

The final medal tally was led by Terengganu, followed by host Federal Territory and Selangor. 5 national and 27 games records were broken during the games. Sabahan archer Eugenius Lo Foh Soon and Terengganuan sprinter Azreen Nabila Alias were announced as best sportsman and best sportswoman of the games respectively.

Host city
On 15 May 2015, during the Sukma executive committee meeting chaired by Youth and Sports Minister Khairy Jamaluddin, the committee jointly awarded Perak and Johor the hosting rights of the 2018 and 2020 Sukma Games respectively.

Development and Preparation

Venues

On 29 May 2016, the federal government allocated RM152 million to the Perak state government for organising the Games. This included RM 20 million that was spent on renovation and repair works for some old sporting facilities such as Perak Stadium, Velodrome Rakyat and Stadium Indera Mulia, and the rebuilding of Ipoh City Council Swimming Complex. The government also states that all 12 districts of Perak will host at least one sporting event.

Volunteers
The organisers estimated that around 3000 volunteers are needed to successfully host the games.

Sponsors

Platinum
 Tenaga Nasional
 Telekom Malaysia
 Al-Ikhsan Sports
Gold
 Tan Chong Motor

Silver
 Sanyu
 Empayar Indera
 Molten Corporation
 Ashaway
 Rizzs
 Petronas

Silver (Continue)
 KL Teh land Development
 Milo
 100 Plus

Bronze
 Boost
 Domino's Pizza
 Palace Vacation Club
 Oratis Rx
 G.B.Kuari
 7-Eleven

Baton relay
A relay of baton (which resembles a torch) was held statewide, began and ended at the host city on 2 and 11 September respectively.

Marketing

Motto

The official motto of the games is "Wow! Kita Hebat!" (Wow! We are great!). Wow is the acronym for World of Wonders, a recognition given by Lonely Planet to Perak during the Visit Perak 2017 tourism campaign.

Logo

The official logo of the 2018 Sukma Games is an image that combines the elements of human and water wave. The human element symbolises the fighting spirit of the athletes at the highest level to achieve success and their positivity, while the water wave element represents the Perak River as the second longest river in Peninsular Malaysia that is the source of the basic needs for all Perak citizens. It was launched on 21 January 2018 at the Bulatan Amanjaya in Ipoh alongside the motto, mascot and the theme song.

Mascot

The official mascot of the 2018 Sukma Games is a Seladang or a Malayan Gaur named "Chor". In Perak, Chor is a name given to anyone in the local community who is the eldest in the family in the Perak Malay dialect. The mascot is designed to wear white sports attire, with its cheeks in yellow, both are which colours of the Perak state flag. It was chosen to portray physical and mental strength and burning spirit of overcoming challenges in sports.

Theme song 

The theme song of the 2018 Sukma Games is “Wow! Kita The Greatest!” (Wow! We are the greatest!). It was composed and sung by Renowned composer and award-winning singer Datuk Wah Idris.

The games

Opening ceremony
The opening ceremony was held on 11 September 2018 at the Perak Stadium at 8:00 pm.

The proceedings:

Arrival of Sultan of Perak, Nazzrin Shah and dignitaries.
National anthem and state anthem of Perak.
Prayer recitation.
Parade of states. Sarawak as host of last edition of Sukma entered stadium first, followed by other states by alphabetical order in Malay language. Johor as host of next edition of Sukma entered the stadium ahead of guest team from Brunei. As per tradition, Perak as host state entered the stadium last.
Countdown projection.
Dato Wah Idris and Ikhwan performed the games' theme song, "Wow, Kita the greatest".
Introductory performance: Indera Sakti.
Speech by sports minister Syed Saddiq, Perak state chief minister Ahmad Azumu.
Sultan of Perak Nazzrin Shah declared the games opened.
Final leg baton relay followed by Lighting of the cauldron. The cauldron resembles the keris, a Malay dagger which is the symbol of the king's power.
Raising of the Sukma Games flag by Royal Malaysian Navy personnel.
Ahmad Khusyairi Abdul Razak, national shooter take the Athletes' oath.
Cultural performance with 3 segments: Pahlawan Dabus (Dabus warrior), Perak Wow, Perak Gemilang (Glorious Perak), drumline and war cry performance. Intel drone and firework performance.

Closing ceremony
The closing ceremony was held on 22 September 2018 at the Perak Stadium at 8:00 pm.

Events:
Deputy Prime Minister Wan Azizah declared the games closed.
Eugenius Lo Fah Soon, Sabah archer awarded best sportsman title, Azreen Nabila Alias, Terengganu sprinter awarded best sportswoman title, Terengganu crowned as overall champion.
Cauldron extinguished, games hosting rights handed over to Johor, host of the 2020 Sukma Games. Followed by cultural performance of Johor.

Participating states

  (495)
  (464)
  (288)
  (376)
  (411)
  (440)
  (483)
  (host) (587)
  (280)
  (416)
  (553)
  (543)
  (542)
  (532)
  (34)

Sports
On 12 December 2017, sports minister Khairy Jamaluddin announced that weightlifting, sepaktakraw and taekwondo have been dropped from the list of 19 core sports as well as the games' sports list due to decline in performances, doping issues as well as power struggles within the associations, leaves only 16 core sports for the 2018 edition. This decision however had drawn dissatisfaction from several sports council across the country including Sarawak and the Federal Territory. On 8 February 2018 after a discussion with the sports associations involved in the issue, Ahmad Shapawi announced during an organising committee meeting that weightlifting, sepaktakraw and taekwondo were reinstated as the games events but only as elective sports. At the same time, a total of 29 sports were confirmed as part of the games programme.

 Aquatics

 
 
 
  
 3×3 basketball
 Basketball
 
 
  
 
 Road
 Track
 BMX
 Mountain bike
 Criterium
 
 Football
 Futsal
 
 Gymnastics
 
 
 
   
  
 
 
  
  
  
  Petanque

Calendar

Medal table 
Gold medal tie in Artistic Gymnastics Women's Individual All-around.

2018 Sopma Games 

The deaf national games known as the 2018 Sopma Games (20th Sopma Games) was held from 15 to 20 October 2018. The opening ceremony was held on 15 October 2018 at 7 pm, while the closing ceremony was held on 20 October 2018 at 7 pm. 551 athletes from 13 states and the federal territories participated at the games. 42 events were featured in 5 sports competed.

2018 Para Sukma Games 

The disabled national games known as the 2018 Para Sukma Games (19th Para Sukma Games) was held from 23 to 28 November 2018.

References

External links
 Official Website 
 Result system site
 Deaf Games website
 Para Sukma website
 

2018 in multi-sport events
2018 in Malaysian sport
September 2018 sports events in Malaysia
Sport in Perak
Sukma Games